The Libertarian Party of Iowa is the Iowa affiliate of the Libertarian Party. It gained major party status in 2017, following Gary Johnson's performance in the 2016 presidential election in Iowa. , there are 11,300 registered Libertarians in the state.

Vote totals for Libertarian candidates in Iowa

U.S. President

2020 U.S. Presidential Caucus Straw Poll

See also

 Richard Campagna
 List of state parties of the Libertarian Party (United States)
 Political party strength in Iowa

Footnotes

External links
 Libertarian Party of Iowa

Iowa
Political parties in Iowa